Death in Sarajevo is a 2016 Bosnian drama film directed by Danis Tanović. It was selected to compete for the Golden Bear at the 66th Berlin International Film Festival. At Berlin it won the Jury Grand Prix, as well as FIPRESCI prize for films shown in competition. It was selected as the Bosnian entry for the Best Foreign Language Film at the 89th Academy Awards but it was not nominated.

Cast
 Snežana Marković as Lamija
 Izudin Bajrović as Omer
 Vedrana Seksan as Vedrana
 Muhamed Hadžović as Gavrilo
 Jacques Weber as Jacques
 Aleksandar Seksan as Enco
 Faketa Salihbegović as Hatidža
 Edin Avdagić Koja as Edo

Reception
The film received mixed reviews. Jay Weissberg praised the film in Variety as an "expertly modulated choral drama". Stephen Dalton writing for The Hollywood Reporter gave a negative review, noting, "The take-home message that historical narratives are always complex and contentious, especially in the Balkans, is unquestionably true but hardly a profound insight. Not quite a political thriller, not quite a provocative drama, not quite an inspired stage adaptation, Death in Sarajevo is a minor addition to Tanović's illustrious body of work."

See also
List of submissions to the 89th Academy Awards for Best Foreign Language Film
List of Bosnian submissions for the Academy Award for Best Foreign Language Film

References

External links

2016 films
2016 drama films
Bosnian-language films
2010s French-language films
Films directed by Danis Tanović
Silver Bear Grand Jury Prize winners
Bosnia and Herzegovina drama films